Glamcult is an Amsterdam-based magazine that focuses on fashion, music, art and (sub)culture. It was first released as an underground tabloid, but is now a progressive independent magazine. Glamcult is a platform that publishes content that is on-trend; exploring avant-garde culture by collaborating with those who are unanswering to authority. Glamcult is created by selected individuals not regulated by normative social, political, and/or geographic factors.

History and profile
Glamcult was originally founded in 2003 by Rogier Vlaming and Wiebe de Ridder as an Independent Style Paper. Vlaming (Editor-in-Chief) is now the sole publisher. In its first year as a newspaper, Glamcult was distributed by bike in the four biggest cities in the Netherlands. Soon it was professionally distributed by a specialised company. However, the DIY attitude still remains as they continue to cycle around Amsterdam, spreading their word. In 2008, Glamcult Independent Style Paper and Supernova Graphic Design, came together and formed Glamcult Studio & Glamcult Magazine.

From 2015, the newspaper developed into a bi-annual magazine and has featured many provocative and inspirational creatives, including Lizzo, FKA Twigs, SOPHIE, Cardi B, Tommy Ca$h, ARCA and many more.

Glamcult Studio
Glamcult Studio is Glamcult's sister company; a graphic design studio, owned and ran by Marline Bakker.

External links 
 Website Glamcult

References

2003 establishments in the Netherlands
Music magazines published in the Netherlands
Dutch-language magazines
Fashion magazines
Independent magazines
Magazines established in 2003
Free magazines